The 2006 Saxony-Anhalt state election was held on 26 March 2006 to elect the members of the 5th Landtag of Saxony-Anhalt. The incumbent coalition government of the Christian Democratic Union (CDU) and Free Democratic Party (FDP) led by Minister-President Wolfgang Böhmer lost its majority. The CDU subsequently formed a coalition with the Social Democratic Party (SPD).

Parties
The table below lists parties represented in the 4th Landtag of Saxony-Anhalt.

Opinion polling

Election result

|-
! colspan="2" | Party
! Votes
! %
! +/-
! Seats 
! +/-
! Seats %
|-
| bgcolor=| 
| align=left | Christian Democratic Union (CDU)
| align=right| 326,721
| align=right| 36.2
| align=right| 1.1
| align=right| 40
| align=right| 8
| align=right| 41.2
|-
| bgcolor=| 
| align=left | The Left.PDS (Linke)
| align=right| 217,295
| align=right| 24.1
| align=right| 3.7
| align=right| 26
| align=right| 1
| align=right| 26.8
|-
| bgcolor=| 
| align=left | Social Democratic Party (SPD)
| align=right| 192,754
| align=right| 21.4
| align=right| 1.4
| align=right| 24
| align=right| 1
| align=right| 24.7
|-
| bgcolor=| 
| align=left | Free Democratic Party (FDP)
| align=right| 60,209
| align=right| 6.7
| align=right| 6.6
| align=right| 7
| align=right| 10
| align=right| 7.2
|-
! colspan=8|
|-
| bgcolor=| 
| align=left | Alliance 90/The Greens (Grüne)
| align=right| 32,117
| align=right| 3.6
| align=right| 1.6
| align=right| 0
| align=right| ±0
| align=right| 0
|-
| bgcolor=| 
| align=left | German People's Union (DVU)
| align=right| 26,905
| align=right| 3.0
| align=right| 3.0
| align=right| 0
| align=right| ±0
| align=right| 0
|-
| 
| align=left | Parent Party (Eltern)
| align=right| 14,499
| align=right| 1.6
| align=right| 1.6
| align=right| 0
| align=right| ±0
| align=right| 0
|-
| bgcolor=|
| align=left | Others
| align=right| 31,754
| align=right| 3.5
| align=right| 
| align=right| 0
| align=right| ±0
| align=right| 0
|-
! align=right colspan=2| Total
! align=right| 902,254
! align=right| 100.0
! align=right| 
! align=right| 97
! align=right| 18
! align=right| 
|-
! align=right colspan=2| Voter turnout
! align=right| 
! align=right| 44.4
! align=right| 12.1
! align=right| 
! align=right| 
! align=right| 
|}

Sources
 Saxony-Anhalt State Statistics Office

2006 elections in Germany
2006